Lee Don-ku ( born February 7, 1988) is a South Korean professional ice hockey defenceman. He is playing for Anyang Halla of Asia League Ice Hockey. He previously played 4 years for Yonsei University.

He has been a member of the South Korean national ice hockey team since 2009. He played in the 2018 Winter Olympics.

References

External links

1988 births
HL Anyang players
Ice hockey players at the 2018 Winter Olympics
Living people
Olympic ice hockey players of South Korea
South Korean ice hockey defencemen
Ice hockey players at the 2011 Asian Winter Games
Ice hockey players at the 2017 Asian Winter Games
Medalists at the 2011 Asian Winter Games
Medalists at the 2017 Asian Winter Games
Asian Games silver medalists for South Korea
Asian Games bronze medalists for South Korea
Asian Games medalists in ice hockey